The Nurse Licensure Compact (NLC) is an agreement that allows mutual recognition (reciprocity) of a nursing license between member U.S. states ("compact states").  Enacted into law by the participating states, the NLC allows a nurse who is a legal resident of and possesses a nursing license in a compact state (their "home state") to practice in any of the other compact states (the "remote states") without obtaining additional licensure in the remote states. It applies to both registered and practical nurses and is also referred to as a multi-state license.

Per the NLC rules, nurses who are licensed in and legal residents of a compact state may not hold licenses from other compact statesthat is, they can only hold one compact state license at a time, which must be from their home state, and a nurse temporarily practicing in a remote state retains their license in their home state. However, if a nurse changes their primary state of residence from one compact state to another compact state, they must transfer their license by applying for licensure by endorsement in the new home state; upon issuance of the new home state license, the license from the former home state is inactivated.

A license obtained in a compact state that is not one's state of legal residency is not recognized by the other compact members, so nurses who are legal residents of non-compact states must obtain licenses for each compact state in which they wish to practice.

Participating states

As of March, 2023, the 37 NLC states are:

Alabama
Arizona
Arkansas
Colorado
Delaware
Florida
Georgia
Idaho
Indiana
Iowa
Kansas
Kentucky
Louisiana
Maine
Maryland
Mississippi
Missouri
Montana
Nebraska
New Hampshire
New Jersey
New Mexico
North Carolina
North Dakota
Ohio 
Oklahoma
Pennsylvania (awaiting implementation)
South Carolina
South Dakota
Tennessee
Texas
Utah
Vermont 
Virginia
West Virginia
Wisconsin
Wyoming
The territory of the US Virgin Islands has passed NLC legislation and entered the compact, but is awaiting an implementation date

Guam has a partial implementation, which allows nurses who hold active, multi-state NLC licenses to practice in Guam. Nurses who claim Guam as their primary place of residency, however, cannot apply for a multi-state license until the NLC is fully implemented.

Ten other states all have active NLC bills. They are:  Alaska, Hawaii,  Illinois, Massachusetts, Minnesota, Nevada, New York, Oregon, Rhode Island, and Washington.

References

NLC history and basic information, bill progress, position statements

 Compact History: https://www.brookings.edu/2023/02/08/nurse-licensure-compacts-before-during-and-after-covid/ 
 Compact Nursing States: 2023 Updated Guide for RNs
 For Alaska Nurses: https://www.akml.org/wp-content/uploads/2023/01/Res2023-17.pdf
 For Hawaii Nurses: https://www.civilbeat.org/2023/02/hawaii-is-short-medical-workers-are-interstate-compacts-the-solution
 For Nevada Nurses: https://nevadanursingboard.org/covid-19-resource-and-information/
 For New York Nurses:   https://youtu.be/gmnxHZ5BEOU  
 For Oregon Nurses: https://olis.oregonlegislature.gov/liz/2023R1/Downloads/PublicTestimonyDocument/52829 
 For Washington State Nurses: https://www.washingtonpolicy.org/publications/detail/joining-37-other-states-in-the-nurse-licensure-compact-is-one-of-the-ways-to-help-washington-patients-nurses-and-hospitals
 For Washington State Nurses: https://mikevolz.houserepublicans.wa.gov/2023/02/17/volzs-nurse-licensure-compact-bill-passes-committee/ 
 One of the Washington State NLC bills (SB5499) just passed through the Washington State Senate and is now in the Washington State House https://app.leg.wa.gov/billsummary?BillNumber=5499&Year=2023&Initiative=false

External links
 National Council of State Boards of Nursing
  National Council of State Boards of Nursing. 2009-03-07. Retrieved 2015-03-07

United States interstate compacts
Nursing in the United States